"The Only" is the first single from the heavy metal band Static-X's third album, Shadow Zone.

The song is featured in Need for Speed: Underground, and on the PC version of the game True Crime: Streets of LA, and in the 2003 MTV Video Music Awards as a background music for an announcer's speech. In Need for Speed Underground, the words "my heaven, your hell" have been replaced by "My heaven, you're losing".

The video was directed by P. R. Brown and features the band facing the walls of a small room with the camera orbiting around them. The walls are lifted by the end of the video revealing a crowd of fans around the room's floor.

Reception
The song was declared to be the number one music video from the band by Billboard magazine in 2014.

Chart performance

References

2003 singles
Static-X songs
Warner Records singles
2003 songs
Songs written by Tony Campos
Songs written by Ken Jay
Songs written by Wayne Static
Songs written by Tripp Eisen
Song recordings produced by Josh Abraham